Yeontan are coal briquettes used in East Asia for cooking and home heating. Made from a mixture of lignite coal dust and a gluing agent that keeps the dust particles together, they are a welcome alternative to firewood and natural coal because they come in a consistent size and stack easily. There are 5 standard sizes for yeontan, and the 2nd standard is widely used in households.

The 2nd standard briquette is cylindrical in shape, weighs 3.5 kg, and is about 20 cm in height and 15 cm in diameter. The standard yeontan has 22 holes drilled into its top to facilitate steady, efficient burning, and a household typically uses one to three briquettes per day in the winter. A new yeontan can be placed on one that has been burned halfway to extend the burn time.

The same fire used for cooking also served to heat the house, through a Korean radiant underfloor heating system called ondol.

History
Introduced to Korea from Japan in the 1920s, yeontan rose in popularity following the Korean War. By 1988, 78% of Korean households used yeontan, but this fell to 33% by 1993 as people switched to oil and gas boilers, and was estimated to be used by just 2% of households by 2001. The boilers reduced the risk of carbon monoxide poisoning, which was a major cause of death in coal-heated houses. 

In recent years amid South Korea's suicide epidemic, yeontan has seen use as a method of suicide by carbon monoxide poisoning.

References

South Korean culture
Coal in South Korea